The Dean Martin Show is a TV variety-comedy series that ran from 1965 to 1974 for 264 episodes. It was broadcast by NBC and hosted by Dean Martin. The theme song to the series was his 1964 hit "Everybody Loves Somebody."

Nielsen ratings
 Season 1 (September 16, 1965 – May 5, 1966, 31 episodes): #52
 Season 2 (September 8, 1966 – April 27, 1967, 33 episodes): #14
 Season 3 (September 14, 1967 – April 4, 1968, 30 episodes): #8
 Season 4 (September 19, 1968 – April 24, 1969, 30 episodes): #8
 Season 5 (September 18, 1969 – June 18, 1970, 31 episodes): #14
 Season 6 (September 17, 1970 – April 8, 1971, 28 episodes): #24
 Season 7 (September 16, 1971 – April 13, 1972, 28 episodes): #36
 Season 8 (September 14, 1972 – April 12, 1973, 28 episodes): #49
 Season 9 (September 6, 1973 – April 5, 1974, 25 episodes): #42

This was Martin's second run as a variety show host, as he previously hosted two variety shows that aired on the NBC anthology series Ford Startime (1959-1960).

The series was a staple for NBC, airing Thursdays at 10:00 p.m. for eight years until its move to Fridays at 10:00 p.m. for the final season and a change in format. It was more popular among white-collar workers than with blue-collar ones; a 1968 survey ranked the show #2 overall among white-collar workers and the highest-ranked first-run series (the highest-rated show among white collar workers was a Saturday night movie umbrella showcase), ranking ahead of the overall first place program The Andy Griffith Show in that demographic.

The Dean Martin Celebrity Roast, a series of specials spun off from the final season, generated solid ratings for 10 years on NBC.

Development
Martin was initially reluctant to do the show, partially because he did not want to turn down movie and nightclub performances. His terms were deliberately unrealistic: as author Lee Hale recalled, "He presented [NBC] with a list of demands he thought it would be impossible to fill. He asked for an outrageous amount of money, of course, but there was more. He only wanted to work one day a week, and that day had to be Sunday. He didn't want to do anything but announce the acts. He didn't even want to sing if he didn't feel like it... But surprisingly NBC agreed to each of his demands. 'They should have thrown them in my face,' Dean said later, 'but they agreed to it all. So what the hell, I had to show up!'" As daughter Deana Martin recalled, after meeting the network and making his demands, Martin returned home and announced to his family, "They went for it. So now I have to do it." (The terms of employment, and not having to appear for rehearsals, allowed Martin to appear in a series of Matt Helm films concurrent with the show's run, as well as other projects such as a co-starring role in the first Airport film in 1970.)

Martin believed that an important key to his popularity was that he did not put on airs. His act was that of a drunken, work-shy playboy, although the ever-present old-fashioned glass in his hand often only had apple juice in it. The show was heavy on physical comedy rather than just quips (he made his weekly entrance by sliding down a fireman's pole onto the stage.) Martin read his dialogue directly from cue cards. If he flubbed a line or forgot a lyric, Martin would not do a retake, and the mistake—and his recovery from it—went straight to tape and onto the air.

The Dean Martin Show was shot on color videotape beginning in 1965 at Studio 4 inside NBC's massive color complex at 3000 West Alameda Avenue in Burbank, California. The same studio was used for Frank Sinatra's yearly TV specials in the late 1960s, and Elvis Presley's 1968 "Comeback Special". Studio 4 is currently one of two used in the production of the soap opera Days of Our Lives.

Regular segments
Martin sang two solo numbers per show, one a serious ballad. He would join his weekly guests in song medleys, trading lyrics back and forth. Some of these duets were deliberately played for laughs—with Liberace, for example—with special lyrics by Lee Hale to suit the performers.
One recurring segment was based on Martin's club act, in which he would begin to sing a popular song and suddenly insert a gag lyric in an attempt to make his pianist Ken Lane laugh hard enough to break his concentration. The segment usually began with Martin leaping onto Lane's piano; in one episode, the real piano was secretly replaced with a phony one that collapsed when Martin tried to leap onto it.
A knock on the "closet" door occurred each week, with Martin opening the door to reveal an unannounced celebrity guest. Most of the time, Martin did not know who the guest would be, to keep his reactions more spontaneous, according to Hale's book Backstage at the Dean Martin Show.
A regular gag during one season was the "Mystery Voice Contest", wherein Martin invited viewers to write in to guess who was singing a particular song. Invariably, it was the famous Frank Sinatra hit "Strangers in the Night." Finally on one episode, Sinatra appeared to announce that he was the mystery singer. Martin handed over the prize, a trip to Los Angeles, where they already lived.
The finale was typically a production number featuring Martin and the guest stars. Occasionally it would be a musical sketch with Martin appearing as "Dino Vino", a disc jockey who played old records. A vintage record would then be heard, with Martin and his guests mouthing the words and pantomiming outrageously.
During the show's eighth season, the finale was a selection of songs from a popular MGM film musical. Clips from the selected film would be shown, with Martin and guests singing a medley from the films. Among those saluted were Easter Parade, Words and Music, Till the Clouds Roll By and the 1951 film version of Show Boat.
When the show was canceled in 1974, a series of Dean Martin Celebrity Roast specials were produced in Las Vegas at the MGM Grand Hotel. This tradition was started during the final season of the variety show and continued until 1984.

Regulars and recurring guests
In later seasons, many regular performers were added, such as Dom DeLuise and Nipsey Russell in sketches set in a barber shop; Kay Medford and Lou Jacobi in sketches set in a diner, and Medford also pretending to be the mother of Martin's pianist, Ken Lane. Leonard Barr, Guy Marks, Tom Bosley, Marian Mercer, Charles Nelson Reilly, and Rodney Dangerfield were also featured on multiple occasions, while bandleader Les Brown was a regular.

During the inaugural 1965–1966 season, the Krofft Puppets were seen in eight episodes. Sid and Marty Krofft recall that they were fired because of an incident involving Liberace, for whom they had previously worked, and who was a great fan of their puppets. Sid Krofft states: "And he [Liberace] asked his fan club to write Dean Martin a letter and tell Dean Martin that there isn't enough puppetry on the show." Many of the letters were nasty and came in great numbers: "And so, can you imagine getting over 250 thousand letters like that in a matter of a couple of weeks, and well, he really didn't like that and fired us."

Summer replacement series
For Martin's Thursday night time slot, the network and Martin's production crew created original summer programming (without Martin) to hold his usual weekly audience. Rowan and Martin hosted the first. Dean Martin's 1966 summer series proved so successful that two seasons later it spawned one of television's most memorable series, Rowan and Martin's Laugh-In.

From July to September 1967, the summer show was co-hosted by Martin's daughter Gail Martin, Vic Damone and Carol Lawrence.

In 1968, Martin's staff came up with a new format: a salute to the 1930s, with a variety show performed as if television existed at that time. Producer Greg Garrison recruited a dozen chorus girls, naming the group the Golddiggers after the Warner Brothers musicals of the 1930s. The series, Dean Martin Presents the Golddiggers, starred Frank Sinatra Jr. and Joey Heatherton as musical hosts, with comedy routines by Paul Lynde, Stanley Myron Handelman, Barbara Heller, Skiles and Henderson, and neo-vaudeville musicians The Times Square Two. The summer show was a hit, returning the following year with a new cast. Lou Rawls and Gail Martin took over as hosts and six-foot-six dancer Tommy Tune was featured.

The Golddiggers also toured the nation's nightclubs as a live attraction. After the summer series ran its course, the Golddiggers were seen on Martin's own program, and four of them were used in another group, the Ding-a-Ling Sisters.

Toward the end of the Thursday-night run, the summer series was devoted to European comedians. Marty Feldman was featured in Dean Martin's Comedy World, hosted by Jackie Cooper.

Awards
Emmy Award nominations

 Outstanding Individual Performance in a Variety or Music Program Foster Brooks (1974)
 Outstanding Individual Performance in a Variety or Music Program Ruth Buzzi (1974)
 Outstanding Variety, Music or Comedy Series (1972)
 Outstanding Music and Lyrics Lee Hale (1971)
 Outstanding Variety, Music or Comedy Series (1970)
 Outstanding Variety, Music or Comedy Series (1969)
 Outstanding Variety, Music or Comedy Series (1968)
 Outstanding Music and Lyrics Lee Hale (1968)
 Outstanding Variety, Music or Comedy Series (1967)
 Outstanding Writing in a Variety, Music or Comedy Program (1967)
 Outstanding Directing for a Variety, Music or Comedy Program Greg Garrison (1967)
 Outstanding Directing for a Variety, Music or Comedy Program Greg Garrison (1966)

Golden Globe Award Wins

 Best Actor in a Television Comedy Series Dean Martin (1967)

Golden Globe Award Nominations

 Best Actor in a Television Comedy Series Dean Martin (1970)
 Best Actor in a Television Comedy Series Dean Martin (1969)
 Best Actor in a Television Comedy Series Dean Martin (1968)

Home media
From 2003 until August 2007, a 29-volume Best of The Dean Martin Variety Show collection was sold by direct marketing firm Guthy-Renker via infomercials and a website.

In mid-2007, NBC Universal filed suit in U.S. District Court against several parties, including Guthy-Renker, claiming copyright infringement, forcing Guthy-Renker to temporarily withdraw the DVDs from sale. The lawsuit dealt with a dispute over rights to footage used in the DVD series, material for which NBC claimed it still held the copyright. The conflict was discovered when NBC Universal looked into plans to release its own DVD set. The Dean Martin Celebrity Roast specials were not affected by the litigation.

Also named as a defendant in the lawsuit was longtime Dean Martin Show producer Greg Garrison. NBC claimed that Garrison had rights only to use excerpts from selected episodes of the show for the DVDs, episodes that the network claimed Garrison had purchased years earlier for a syndicated run of the show from 1979 to 1981. Garrison died in 2005 before the lawsuit was brought forward.

After a settlement was reached on January 2, 2008, Guthy-Renker began selling the collection again, and its televised infomercials returned.

Two other lawsuits were brought over rights to the show's material, neither of which affected sales of the home-video collection.

Total revenues from DVD sales of The Dean Martin Show have been rumored to be in the hundreds of millions of dollars. The shows have not been aired on television since their original telecasts.

A new package of DVDs was released on May 24, 2011 by Time-Life Video. Unlike the earlier Guthy-Renker collection, which was marketed via mail-order subscription, the new sets were aimed largely at the retail sector. NBC disclosed its participation with Time-Life on the project.

Dean's daughter Deana Martin claimed that the first Time-Life sets had sold so well that a second collection was being planned, and that she would be contributing commentary for it. The second release of DVDs produced by Time-Life was titled King of Cool: The Best of The Dean Martin Variety Show and was made available in one- and six-disc configurations.

Guest-star list
Only the first appearance by each guest star is listed.

Season 1 (1965–1966)

Season 2 (1966–1967)

Season 3 (1967–1968)

Season 4 (1968–1969)

Season 5 (1969–1970)

Season 6 (1970–1971)

Season 7 (1971–1972)

Season 8 (1972–1973)

Season 9 (1973–1974)

Use of screenshots for Billy Meier's alien hoax
The UFO religion leader Billy Meier has passed off images of The Golddiggers performing on The Dean Martin Show as photographs of extraterrestrials that he met who physically resemble humans from Earth. This was first revealed by Meier's ex-wife, Kalliope Zafiriou, that the photographs Meier claimed were of the alien women "Asket" and "Nera" were actually photographs of Michelle DellaFave and Susan Lund from The Golddiggers. It was later confirmed that the images of the so-called "aliens" were a hoax and were indeed screenshots taken from a Golddiggers performance featuring DellaFave and Lund on an episode of The Dean Martin Show and thus of earthly and not extraterrestrial origin and were photographs of earthlings.

References

Further reading
 Hale, Lee. Backstage at the Dean Martin Show. Taylor Trade Publishing, 2000. .

External links

 

NBC original programming
1965 American television series debuts
1974 American television series endings
1960s American musical comedy television series
1970s American musical comedy television series
1960s American sketch comedy television series
1970s American sketch comedy television series
1960s American variety television series
1970s American variety television series
Dean Martin
Roast (comedy)
English-language television shows
Television series by Universal Television